Eduard Tubau Cutal (born 6 January 1981) is a Spanish professional field hockey player. He plays as a striker. He represented the Spanish men's national team at four consecutive Olympics, starting in 2000, including the team that won the silver medal at the 2008 Olympics. He played club hockey for Club de Campo and Club Egara.

References 
 Spanish Olympic Committee

External links

1981 births
Living people
Field hockey players from Catalonia
Spanish male field hockey players
Male field hockey forwards
Sportspeople from Terrassa
Olympic field hockey players of Spain
Field hockey players at the 2000 Summer Olympics
2002 Men's Hockey World Cup players
Field hockey players at the 2004 Summer Olympics
2006 Men's Hockey World Cup players
Field hockey players at the 2008 Summer Olympics
2010 Men's Hockey World Cup players
Field hockey players at the 2012 Summer Olympics
2014 Men's Hockey World Cup players
Medalists at the 2008 Summer Olympics
Olympic silver medalists for Spain
Olympic medalists in field hockey
Club Egara players
Club de Campo Villa de Madrid players